Pieta Roberta van Dishoeck (born 13 May 1972 in Hilversum, North Holland) is a retired rower from the Netherlands who won two Olympic medals during her career. She claimed the silver medal in the women's double sculls, alongside Eeke van Nes, and in the women's eight with coxswain in the 2000 Summer Olympics in Sydney, Australia.

References
  Dutch Olympic Committee

1972 births
Living people
Dutch female rowers
Rowers at the 2000 Summer Olympics
Olympic rowers of the Netherlands
Olympic silver medalists for the Netherlands
Sportspeople from Hilversum
Olympic medalists in rowing
Medalists at the 2000 Summer Olympics
21st-century Dutch women
20th-century Dutch women